Delonix decaryi is a species of plant in the family Fabaceae. It is found only in Madagascar.

References

decaryi
Endemic flora of Madagascar
Taxonomy articles created by Polbot
Plants described in 1948